Bear Creek is an unincorporated community in San Joaquin County, California, United States.

References

Unincorporated communities in California
Unincorporated communities in San Joaquin County, California